Rolando Benedetti was an Italian film editor. He edited more than thirty films between 1941 and 1954 including Federico Fellini's The White Sheik and I Vitelloni.

Selected filmography

 C'è sempre un ma! (1942)
 The Adventures of Fra Diavolo (1942)
 Don Cesare di Bazan (1942)
 I'll Sing No More (1945)
 The Nun of Monza (1947)
 How I Lost the War (1948)
 In the Name of the Law (1949)
 How I Discovered America (1949)
 Captain Demonio (1950)
 Mistress of the Mountains (1950)
 Path of Hope (1950)
 Il monello della strada (1950)
 Behind Closed Shutters (1951)
 Four Ways Out (1951)
 The Crossroads (1951)
 Lorenzaccio (1951)
 Napoleon (1951)
 The White Sheik (1952)
 The Angels of the District (1952)
 The Temptress (1952)
 Mademoiselle Gobete (1952)
 The Bandit of Tacca Del Lupo (1952)
 I Vitelloni (1953)
 Jealousy (1953)
 Puccini (1953)
 Fatal Desire (1953)
 Mid-Century Loves (1954)

References

Bibliography
 Chris Wiegand. Federico Fellini: Ringmaster of Dreams, 1920-1993. Taschen, 2003.

External links

Italian film editors
Year of birth missing
Year of death missing